This is a list of mine warfare vessels of the Ottoman Steam Navy:

Mine depot ship (Mayın depo gemisi)

Giresun

Minelayer (Mayın dökme gemisi)

Selânik

Samsun

İntibâh

Muzaffer

Nusret

Gayret

Nilüfer

Ron

Minesweeper ship (Mayın tarama gemisi)

Castor class

Minesweeper boat (Mayın tarama botu)

MTB 1 class

MTB 7 class

Sources

External links 
Minelayer Nusret, Big Bad Battleships

Ottoman steam navy
Naval ships of the Ottoman Empire
Lists of ships of the Ottoman Empire